Saw Khin Htut was a princess of the Pagan Dynasty of Burma (Myanmar). She was a daughter of King Kyaswa, and the mother of Queen Saw Soe. Her husband was Yazathingyan who served as the chief minister of her father, and his two successors. She had at least two children Saw San and Saw Soe with Yazathingyan. She may also be the mother of Yazathingyan's two other children Ananda Pyissi and Yanda Pyissi, who were generals in the Pagan army, although chronicles do not explicitly identify her as the mother.

References

Bibliography
 

Pagan dynasty
13th-century Burmese women